In geometry, a Cassini oval is a quartic plane curve defined as the locus of points in the plane such that the product of the distances to two fixed points (foci) is constant. This may be contrasted with an ellipse, for which the sum of the distances is constant, rather than the product. Cassini ovals are the special case of polynomial lemniscates when the polynomial used has degree 2.

Cassini ovals are named after the astronomer Giovanni Domenico Cassini who studied them in the late 17th century. 
Cassini believed that the Sun traveled around the Earth on one of these ovals, with the Earth at one focus of the oval.
Other names include Cassinian ovals, Cassinian curves and ovals of Cassini.

Formal definition

A Cassini oval is a set of points, such that for any point  of the set, the product of the distances  to two fixed points  is a constant, usually written as  where : 

As with an ellipse, the fixed points  are called the foci of the Cassini oval.

Equations
If the foci are (a, 0) and (−a, 0), then the equation of the curve is

When expanded this becomes

The equivalent polar equation is

Shape

The curve depends, up to similarity, on e = b/a. When e < 1, the curve consists of two disconnected loops, each of which contains a focus. When e = 1, the curve is the lemniscate of Bernoulli having the shape of a sideways figure eight with a double point (specifically, a crunode) at the origin. When e > 1, the curve is a single, connected loop enclosing both foci. The limiting case of a → 0 (hence e → ), in which case the foci coincide with each other, is a circle.

The curve always has x-intercepts at ± c where c2 = a2 + b2. When e < 1 there are two additional real x-intercepts and when e > 1 there are two real y-intercepts, all other x- and y-intercepts being imaginary.

The curve has double points at the circular points at infinity, in other words the curve is bicircular. These points are biflecnodes, meaning that the curve has two distinct tangents at these points and each branch of the curve has a point of inflection there. From this information and Plücker's formulas it is possible to deduce the Plücker numbers for the case e ≠ 1: degree = 4, class = 8, number of nodes = 2, number of cusps = 0, number of double tangents = 8, number of points of inflection = 12, genus = 1.

The tangents at the circular points are given by x ± iy = ± a which have real points of intersection at (± a, 0). So the foci are, in fact, foci in the sense defined by Plücker. The circular points are points of inflection so these are triple foci. When e ≠ 1 the curve has class eight, which implies that there should be a total of eight real foci. Six of these have been accounted for in the two triple foci and the remaining two are at 

So the additional foci are on the x-axis when the curve has two loops and on the y-axis when the curve has a single loop.

Cassini ovals and orthogonal trajectories 

Orthogonal trajectories of a given pencil of curves are curves which intersect all given curves orthogonally. For example the orthogonal trajectories of a pencil of confocal ellipses are the confocal hyperbolas with the same foci. For Cassini ovals one has:
The orthogonal trajectories of the Cassini curves with foci  are the equilateral hyperbolas containing  with the same center as the Cassini ovals (see picture).

Proof:
For simplicity one chooses . 
The Cassini ovals have the equation

The equilateral hyperbolas (their asymptotes are rectangular) containing  with center  can be described by the equation

Their discriminants show that these curves are hyperbolas. A more detailed investigation reveals that the hyperbolas are rectangular. In order to get normals, which are independent from parameter  the following implicit representation is more convenient 

A simple calculation shows that  for all . Hence the Cassini ovals and the hyperbolas intersect orthogonally.

Remark:
The image depicting the Cassini ovals and the hyperbolas looks like the equipotential curves of two equal point charges together with the lines of the generated electrical field. But for the potential of two equal point charges one has . (See Implicit curve.)

The single-loop and double loop Cassini curves can be represented as the orthogonal trajectories of each other when each family is coaxal but not confocal.

Examples
The second lemniscate of the Mandelbrot set is a Cassini oval defined by the equation   Its foci are at the points c on the complex plane that have orbits where every second value of z is equal to zero, which are the values 0 and −1.

Cassini ovals on tori 

Cassini ovals appear as planar sections of tori, but only when 
the cutting plane is parallel to the axis of the torus and its distance to the axis equals the radius of the generating circle (see picture).

The intersection of the torus with equation

and the plane  yields

After partially resolving the first bracket one gets the equation

Generalizations 
Cassini's method is easy to generalize to curves and surfaces with an arbitrarily many defining points:

describes in the planar case an implicit curve and in 3-space an implicit surface.

See also

Two-center bipolar coordinates

References

Bibliography

Lawden, D. F., "Families of ovals and their orthogonal trajectories", Mathematical Gazette 83, November 1999, 410–420.

External links

 
 MacTutor description
 
 2Dcurves.com description
 "MacTutor History of Mathematics" Famous Curves

Plane curves
Algebraic curves
Spiric sections
Giovanni Domenico Cassini